Renaud Hardy (born April 1, 1962), known as The Parkinson's Murderer, is a Belgian serial killer who was sentenced to life imprisonment for murder, rape and attempted murder in 2018.

Arrest 
On September 16, 2015, Linda Doms was murdered in Zemst, Flemish Brabant. Her corpse was discovered a few days later by a neighbor. Several people were interviewed, including Hardy, a former friend of Doms. Initially, the investigators had no evidence of Hardy's involvement and he was released. When the investigators found images on Hardy's memory card showing the crime scene, Hardy was rearrested on September 21, 2015.

During the arrest, the Mechelen court again opened an investigation into older files. From DNA traces a link was established to the murder of 82-year-old Marie Walschaerts, which was committed in Leest in May 2014, and an attempted murder in September 2014 in Bonheiden. He is also the suspected perpetrator of an attack on Belgian actress Veerle Eyckermans in February 2015, who at the time lived near Hardy. He is also considered responsible for the murder of an 85-year-old in Boortmeerbeek in December 2011.

Hardy had been arraigned a week before Doms' murder, with the help of sex offender Doris Corbeel, because in 2014 he had shot a passer-by with an air gun. In his own words, he saw the woman riding on the bike and suddenly had the urge to harm her.

Parkinson's 
In 2007, doctors diagnosed Hardy with Parkinson's disease. The disease and its influence on his actions received much attention during his trial, with some Belgian media even calling him the "Parkinson's murderer". It was also mentioned that he took medicine to treat the disease, where a well-known neurologist, Chris Van Der Linden, stated that he had become a murderer due to the addicting medication. Also during the trial, Hardy's defense often cited the disease as a mitigating factor.

Condemnation 
The trial began on February 9, 2018. After almost a month, on March 8, 2018, Hardy was declared guilty by the people's jury. He was sentenced to life imprisonment.

See also
List of serial killers by country

References

1962 births
Belgian people convicted of murder
Belgian people convicted of rape
Belgian rapists
Belgian serial killers
Living people
Male serial killers
People convicted of attempted murder
People from Mechelen